Push–pull  may refer to:

In electronic technology
Push–pull output, type of electronic circuit
Push–pull converter, in electronics, is a type of DC to DC converter that uses a transformer
Push–pull connector, an electronic cable connector
Push technology / Pull technology, in network communications

In transport technology
Push–pull configuration, on aircraft
Push–pull train, a train able to be operated by a driver at either end
Push-to-pull compression fittings, a type of compression fitting that allows air line to be attached without the use of tools

In other technology
Push processing, and its counterpart "pull processing" in photography
Push-and-pull enteroscopy, an endoscopic technique for visualization of the small bowel
Push–pull olefin, in organic chemistry
Push–pull perfusion, an in vivo sampling method
Push–pull technology, in agricultural pest management

In the arts
Push Pull (Hoobastank album), 2018
"(Do The) Push and Pull", a 1970 soul song
Hans Hofmann's "push/pull" theory, concerning perceived depth in abstract painting
Pushmi-pullyu, fictional breed of antelope

Other uses
Push–pull agricultural pest management, in farming, an intercropping strategy for controlling agricultural pests.
Push–pull strategy, in logistics, supply chain management and marketing
Push–pull workout, a type of weight-lifting routine

See also
Push and pull (disambiguation)